Serbelodon is an extinct genus of proboscidean. It had tusks and a trunk. It lived in North America during the Miocene Epoch, and it was closely related to Amebelodon. They had a diet that consisted of C3 plants which include fruits, tree cortex, herbs, and leaves.

Serbelodon burnhami was named after Frederick Russell Burnham the brother-in-law of the fossil's discoverer John C. Blick.

References 

Amebelodontidae
Miocene mammals of North America
Prehistoric mammals of North America
Miocene proboscideans
Prehistoric placental genera
Fossil taxa described in 1933